The 1999–2000 Drexel Dragons men's basketball team represented Drexel University  during the 1999–2000 NCAA Division I men's basketball season. The Dragons, led by 1st year head coach Steve Seymour, played their home games at the Daskalakis Athletic Center and were members of the America East Conference (AEC).

The team finished the season 13–17, and finished in 5th place in the AEC in the regular season.

Roster

Schedule

|-
!colspan=9 style="background:#F8B800; color:#002663;"| Regular season
|-

|-
!colspan=9 style="background:#F5CF47; color:#002663;"| AEC tournament

Awards
Mike Kouser
AEC All-Conference Second Team

References

Drexel Dragons men's basketball seasons
Drexel
1999 in sports in Pennsylvania
2000 in sports in Pennsylvania